Wilson Lee Stone (November 16, 1952 – June 17, 2022) was an American politician from Kentucky. He served as a member of the Kentucky House of Representatives for the 22nd district from 2009 to 2021. Stone died following a long illness on June 17, 2022, at the age of 69.

References

1952 births
2022 deaths
People from Scottsville, Kentucky
Democratic Party members of the Kentucky House of Representatives
21st-century American politicians